Beyond Bengal is a 1934 American film directed by Harry Schenck.

The film is also known as Bengal, Harry Schenck's Beyond in the United States (complete title).

Plot
The record of an expedition deep into the Malayan jungle.

 Harry Schenck as Harry Scheneck
 Joan Baldwin as Joan
 John Martin as John Martin, Narrator
 Capt. Nain Sei as Captain Nain Sei
 Ali as Ali
 Bee as Bee
 Sultan Iskandar Shah as The Sultan of Perak

References

External links
 
 
 

1934 films
1934 adventure films
American black-and-white films
American adventure films
1930s English-language films
1930s American films